The men's 10,000 metres at the 1938 European Athletics Championships was held in Paris, France, at Stade Olympique de Colombes on 5 September 1938.

Medalists

Results

Final
5 September

Participation
According to an unofficial count, 10 athletes from 6 countries participated in the event.

 (1)
 (2)
 (1)
 (2)
 (2)
 (2)

References

10000
10,000 metres at the European Athletics Championships